Club Deportivo Barquereño is a Spanish football team based in San Vicente de la Barquera, in the autonomous community of Cantabria. Founded in 1953, it plays in Tercera División – Group 3, holding home matches at Campo Municipal El Castañar, with a capacity of 3,500 people.

Season to season

13 seasons in Tercera División

References

External links
La Preferente profile 
Soccerway team profile

Football clubs in Cantabria
Association football clubs established in 1953
1953 establishments in Spain